Solomon Cohen Jr. (August 15, 1802 – August 14, 1875) was a lawyer, prominent in Savannah, Georgia, where he was also postmaster, the state's first Jewish senator, a district attorney, a real-estate developer and banker. He established the first Jewish Sunday School in Georgia.

He is mentioned in the memoirs of General William Tecumseh Sherman as being a "rich lawyer".

Life and career
Cohen was born on August 15, 1802, in Georgetown, South Carolina, to Solomon Cohen Sr. and Bella Moses. One of his siblings, brother Octavus, was a cotton merchant. His brother-in-law was Isaac Minis, husband of his sister Dinah.

In 1836, he married Miriam Gratz Moses, niece of Rebecca Gratz, a philanthropist from Philadelphia. They had three known children, two of whom died relatively young (including Gratz, who was killed in the Battle of Bentonville, aged 20). Daughter Miriam Gratz lived until the age of 80. She was married to James Troup Dent Sr., a Confederate Army veteran.

Cohen was the de facto publisher and distributor of the works of Grace Aguilar, the English novelist who was of interest to his wife and her aunt.

In 1839, Cohen and his brother-in-law Mordecai Myers (husband of his sister Sarah Henrietta) helped established the Georgia Historical Society. Cohen was its treasurer between 1841 and 1844, and its vice-president between 1864 and 1868.

He served as the president of the Congregation Mickve Israel for several years.

Shortly before his death, Cohen had built the home at today's 116–120 West Liberty Street, an addition to the 1851-built number 124.

Cohen was a slave-owner. At one point, he owned eight slaves and hired out an additional fifteen.

Properties
In addition to his home at 116–120 West Liberty Street, Cohen also built properties at 124 West Liberty Street (1851) and 17 West Bay Street (1869).

Death
Cohen died on August 14, 1875, aged 72. He is interred in Savannah's Laurel Grove Cemetery, alongside his wife, who survived him by sixteen years.

References

1802 births
1875 deaths
People from Georgetown, South Carolina
People from Savannah, Georgia
Georgia (U.S. state) lawyers
Jewish-American slave owners
Jewish Confederates